Michael Babb (born 14 October 1963 in Farnborough, Kent) is a British sport shooter. He has competed for Team GB in small-bore rifle prone at two Olympics (2000 and 2004), and has been close to an Olympic medal in 2004, finishing in seventh position. Apart from his Olympic career, Babb has won a total of seven medals in a major international competition, including two silvers at the Commonwealth Games (2002 and 2006). Throughout his sporting career, Babb trains full-time under assistant head coach Kimmo Yli-Jaskari of the national team, while he shoots at Appleton Rifle Club in Warrington.

Babb began shooting small-bore rifle at the age of 14, and quickly progressed to the British Junior Training Squad that culminated him in a runner-up finish at the European Championships in 1983. As medals and records followed, Babb attained a reserve position for the 1984 Summer Olympics in Los Angeles, but his marksmanship prominence did not occur until 1999, when he won a silver in rifle prone at the European Championships in Bordeaux, France. Babb's monumental effort had earned him an Olympic place for Team GB on his debut at Sydney 2000, but suddenly failed to reach the final in the 50 m rifle prone, after finishing in a five-way tie for twenty-fifth place at 592 points.

In 2002, Babb was able to back up his feat from the Olympics when England hosted the Commonwealth Games at Manchester. There, he pocketed a silver medal in his signature event with a score of 699.0, losing the title to Australia's Timothy Lowndes by less than a point. Babb also teamed up with Neil Day to dominate the field in the rifle prone pairs, recording a first-place combined score at 1189 points. On that same season, Babb won his first ever individual gold at the ISSF World Cup meet in Milan, Italy with a brilliant 700.7, securing him an Olympic berth for Britain at his second Games.

At the 2004 Summer Olympics in Athens, Babb qualified for his second British team in the men's 50 m rifle prone. Clearly an Olympic medal hopeful, Babb shot 595 out of a possible 600 to grab the sixth seed from the prelims, before ruling out of his contention to seventh in the eight-man final round with 101.8 points for a total of 696.8.

Shortly after the Olympics, Babb won a silver medal in the rifle prone at the 2006 Commonwealth Games in Melbourne with a score of 696.2, repeating his effort at Manchester four years earlier.

References

External links

1964 births
Living people
British male sport shooters
Olympic shooters of Great Britain
Shooters at the 2000 Summer Olympics
Shooters at the 2004 Summer Olympics
Shooters at the 2002 Commonwealth Games
Shooters at the 2006 Commonwealth Games
Shooters at the 2010 Commonwealth Games
Commonwealth Games gold medallists for England
Commonwealth Games silver medallists for England
Commonwealth Games medallists in shooting
21st-century British people
Medallists at the 2002 Commonwealth Games
Medallists at the 2006 Commonwealth Games
Medallists at the 2010 Commonwealth Games